Gill Valentine  is a British geographer, currently Professor of Geography and Pro-Vice-Chancellor for Social Sciences at the University of Sheffield. She is a member of the university's executive board and has chaired the Equality, Diversity & Inclusion Committee.

Before joining Sheffield in 2012, Valentine was head of Geography at the University of Leeds. She co-founded the journal Social & Cultural Geography in 2000.

Career 
Valentine worked at the University of Sheffield between 1994 and 2004, at which point she left to work at the University of Leeds where she was head of the school of geography. In 2012, she re-joined Sheffield as Pro-Vice Chancellor for Social Sciences. Valentine is a member of the university's executive board, and has chaired the Equality, Diversity & Inclusion Committee.

Research
Valentine is a specialist in social geography, with her key areas of research covering social identities and belonging; childhood, parenting and family life; and urban cultures and consumption. Her research in particular has focused on geographies of childhood, on alcohol-consumption and youth culture and on women's geographies. A co-founder of the journal Social & Cultural Geography and co-editor of former co-editor of Gender, Place and Culture, she has made significant contributions to feminist geography.

"Aldi-level products" comments 
On 18 June 2021, during the ongoing dispute with the Department of Archaeology at the University of Sheffield, it was reported that Valentine had not followed due process in explaining to students during meetings on the purpose as to why they were being recruited for discussion groups and described prospective students as "Aldi-level products". One student reported that when challenged as to the reason why the Department was not allowed to accept flexible grade boundaries from A-level students, Valentine replied, "We need to protect our brand. If you shop at Marks & Spencers, and then Marks & Spencers brings in Aldi-level products, then people won't want to shop with you anymore."

Awards
The Philip Leverhulme Prize, 2001 
 The Royal Geographical Society's Gill Memorial Award, 
 Murchison Award by the Royal Geographical Society for "publications relating to the geography of difference, equality and diversity" (2015) 
Fellow of the Academy of Social Sciences.
Fellow of the British Academy (FBA), 2018

Selected publications
 1989. "The geography of women's fear" in Area 12(1)pp. 385–390
 1995. Mapping desire: Geographies of sexualities Psychology Press (with David Bell)
 1997. Consuming geographies: We are where we eat Psychology Press (with David Bell)
 2005. Cool places: Geographies of youth cultures Routledge

References

Year of birth missing (living people)
Living people
Academics of the University of Sheffield
Academics of the University of Leeds
Fellows of the Academy of Social Sciences
Fellows of the British Academy
Women geographers
Fellows of the Royal Geographical Society
British geographers
English geographers
Human geographers
21st-century geographers
21st-century English women
English feminists
British women social scientists
British social scientists
21st-century English educators